Mr. Guitar is an album by American jazz guitarist Charlie Byrd featuring tracks recorded in 1960 and released on the Riverside label in 1962. The album was first released on the Washington Records Offbeat imprint as Jazz at the Showboat, Vol. 3 but only received limited distribution prior to Byrd signing with Riverside.

Reception

Allmusic awarded the album 4½ stars calling it "a delightful trio outing with an adroit and light feel".

Track listing
All compositions written by Charlie Byrd except as indicated
 "Blues for Felix" - 2:57   
 "Gypsy in My Soul" (Clay Boland, Moe Jaffe) - 2:54   
 "In a Mellotone" (Duke Ellington) - 3:13   
 "Prelude to a Kiss" (Ellington, Mack Gordon, Gordon Mills) - 4:43   
 "Travelin' On" - 2:34   
 "Play Fiddle, Play" (Arthur Altman, Emory Deutsch, Jack Lawrence) - 3:35   
 "Funky Flamenco" - 2:49   
 "My One and Only"  (George Gershwin, Ira Gershwin) - 2:41   
 "Mama, I'll Be Home Some Day" - 3:11   
 "How Long Has This Been Going On?" (Gershwin, Gershwin) - 3:41   
 "Who Cares?" (Gershwin, Gershwin) - 2:12   
 "Lay the Lily Low" - 5:54

Personnel 
Charlie Byrd - guitar
Keter Betts - bass
Bertell Knox - drums

References 

1962 albums
Charlie Byrd albums
Riverside Records albums